Broadmeadows is a rural locality in the local government area (LGA) of Circular Head in the North-west and west LGA region of Tasmania. The 2016 census recorded a population of 40 for the state suburb of Broadmeadows.

History 
Broadmeadows was gazetted as a locality in 1973. 

This area was cleared of heavy timber and drained to become prime farming land.

Geography
The Duck River forms the north-eastern boundary. Many of the boundaries are survey lines.

Road infrastructure 
Route A2 (Bass Highway) runs through from north-east to south-west.

References

Towns in Tasmania
Localities of Circular Head Council